Govan Mbeki Local Municipality (formerly Highveld East Local Municipality) is a South African local municipality situated in the Gert Sibande District Municipality, of Mpumalanga. Secunda is the seat of the municipality.

Main places
The 2001 census divided the municipality into the following main places:

Politics 

The municipal council consists of sixty-three members elected by mixed-member proportional representation. Thirty-two councillors are elected by first-past-the-post voting in thirty-two wards, while the remaining thirty-one are chosen from party lists so that the total number of party representatives is proportional to the number of votes received. In the election of 1 November 2021 the African National Congress (ANC) lost its majority, but remained the largest party, winning twenty-six seats.
The following table shows the results of the election.

Corruption
After allegations of endemic corruption a forensic investigation was launched by the Department of Cooperative Governance (DCoG). The Section 106 forensic investigation report released in 2020 revealed extensive political interference in its administration. The report revealed non-implementation of council resolutions, abuse of municipal property and assets, advertisement of tenders without following legislation and awarding of bursaries without following procedures. Senior positions were occupied by politically affiliated persons who lacked the minimum required qualifications or even a matric certificate. In addition several companies that got preferential treatment had senior politicians on their payroll. The senior politician and executive mayor, Ms Thandi Ngxonono, was implicated in the report and took special leave.

References

External links
 Official website

Local municipalities of the Gert Sibande District Municipality